Josef Pollák (born 23 March 1960) is an orienteering competitor who competed for Czechoslovakia. At the 1983 World Orienteering Championships in Zalaegerszeg he won a silver medal in the relay, together with Vlastimil Uchytil, Pavel Ditrych and Jaroslav Kacmarcik.

References

1960 births
Living people
Czechoslovak orienteers
Male orienteers
Foot orienteers
World Orienteering Championships medalists